The men's 10,000 metres event at the 2016 IAAF World U20 Championships was held at Zdzisław Krzyszkowiak Stadium on 19 July.

Medalists

Records

Results

References

10000 metres
Long distance running at the World Athletics U20 Championships